Miroslav Enchev (born 8 August 1991) is a Bulgarian professional footballer who plays as a defender.

Career
On 16 January 2018 Enchev joined Cherno More Varna from Vereya Stara Zagora.  On 17 February, he made his debut in a 1–4 home defeat by Beroe.

Honours
Beroe Stara Zagora
Bulgarian Cup: 2009–10

References

External links

1991 births
Living people
Sportspeople from Stara Zagora
Bulgarian footballers
Association football defenders
First Professional Football League (Bulgaria) players
Second Professional Football League (Bulgaria) players
PFC Beroe Stara Zagora players
Neftochimic Burgas players
FC Botev Galabovo players
FC Vereya players
PFC Cherno More Varna players